The following is a list of awards and nominations received by Colombian actress and producer Catalina Sandino Moreno.

Academy Awards

Berlin International Film Festival

Critics' Choice Movie Award

Colombian Cinema Award

Chicago Film Critics Association Awards

Dallas-Fort Worth Film Critics Association Awards

Gotham Awards

Imagen Foundation Awards

Independent Spirit Awards

London Critics Circle Film Awards

Los Angeles Film Critics Association Awards

Nashville Film Festival

Online Film Critics Society Awards

Satellite Awards

Screen Actors Guild Awards

Seattle Film Critics Awards

Seattle Internatiodsgf

References

External links

Photos "Cristiada": Catalina Sandino filming in Durango, México

Lists of awards received by actor